The province of Ancona is a province in the Marche region of central Italy. Its capital is the city of Ancona, and the province borders the Adriatic Sea. The city of Ancona is also the capital of Marche.

To the north, the province is bordered by the Adriatic Sea, and the Apennine Mountains to the west. The population of the province is mostly located in coastal areas and in the provincial capital Ancona, which has a population of 101,518; the province has a total population of 477,892 as of 2015. Due to its coastal location, it is strategically important. The president of the province is Liana Serrani.

Its coastline of sandy beaches is popular with Italians but has not been greatly affected by tourism. A large area of the province's land is farmland often used for wine production; the province produces wines using the Montepulciano, Sangiovese, and Verdicchio varieties of grape. Annually, feasts occur in the province during the harvesting period. It contains mountainous regions and the Conero Regional Park, which contain dense forests where black truffles are found. These are sold in Acqualagna in the neighbouring province of Pesaro e Urbino.

Famous people born of the province of Ancona include Frederick II, Holy Roman Emperor (Jesi); International Gothic painter Gentile da Fabriano (Fabriano); writer Rafael Sabatini (Jesi); composer Gaspare Spontini (Maiolati, which has since been named after him as Maiolati Spontini); composer Giovanni Battista Pergolesi (Jesi); mathematician and physicist Vito Volterra (Ancona); footballer Roberto Mancini (Jesi); Pope Leo XII (Genga); Pope Pius IX (Senigallia); and actress Virna Lisi (Jesi).

See also
Comunes of the Province of Ancona

References

External links
Official website

 
Ancona